James Morgan (December 29, 1756 – November 11, 1822) was a Continental Army officer during the American Revolutionary War and a United States Congressman from New Jersey.

Background
Morgan was born in South Amboy, New Jersey, in 1756, the son of Captain James Morgan Sr. and Margaret Evertson. The family's compound in Sayreville, New Jersey, known as Morgan Manor, was initially established by Margaret's father Nicholas Evertson.

He attended the public schools in New Jersey, and later served as an officer in the New Jersey Line during the Revolutionary War.  He went on to serve as a representative in the general assembly in Philadelphia, 1794–1799, and, later, was elected as a Democratic-Republican to the Twelfth Congress (March 4, 1811 – March 3, 1813).  He was also engaged in agricultural pursuits, and became a major general of militia.  He died in Morgan Manor, New Jersey, on November 11, 1822 and was interred in the Morgan private cemetery.

References

1756 births
1822 deaths
People from Middlesex County, New Jersey
American militia generals
American people of Welsh descent
American people of Dutch descent
Continental Army officers from New Jersey
People of colonial New Jersey
People of New Jersey in the American Revolution
Burials in New Jersey
Democratic-Republican Party members of the United States House of Representatives from New Jersey